William Stimpson (died by 1826) was a planter and slave-owner in Jamaica. He owned the Java Plantation in Manchester Parish and had interests in others. He was elected to the House of Assembly of Jamaica in 1820 for the parish of Vere.

References 

Members of the House of Assembly of Jamaica
Year of birth missing
1820s deaths